William Dickinson (18 February 1906 – 17 August 1968) was an English footballer who played in The Football League for Wigan Borough, Nottingham Forest, Rotherham United, Southend United, and Hull City.

References

1906 births
1968 deaths
Footballers from Wigan
English footballers
Association football forwards
English Football League players
Wigan Borough F.C. players
Nottingham Forest F.C. players
Rotherham United F.C. players
Southend United F.C. players
Hull City A.F.C. players